The Renfe Class 311 is a class of four axle Bo'Bo' diesel electric shunting and light freight locomotives.

Background and design

The prototype locomotive 311.001 was designed by M.T.M. (Barcelona), Ateinsa (Madrid) and Babcock & Wilcox (Bilbao); the project was led by the Instituto Nacional de Industria.

The prototype locomotive led to an order of 60 units, which were assigned to the subclass 311.1, and numbered 311.101 to 311.160.

The transmission system uses 4 axle hung pinion drive three-phase asynchronous motors powered by a three phase alternator driven by a MTU engine partly license built by Bazán. Siemens supplied Sibas-16 microprocessor engine control systems.

The prototype locomotive was initially painted orange with a white stripe, the series production were all given a red/silver livery; standard for Renfe shunting locomotives. Some units have subsequently received a more recent white/grey Renfe livery. As of 2010 most of the units are operated by Renfe Mercancías, about one third have been assigned to the infrastructure company Adif.

Derivatives
The locomotives were a success for the Spanish engineering industry, and the design formed the basis of a number of locomotive types exported from the Meinfesa factory: the SBB Am 841 (40 units 1994), the GA DE900 locomotives for Mexico, Israel and Egypt (35 units, 1997-2000) and the SNCF Class BB 60000 (175 units, 2004-8).

See also
Renfe Class 309 and Renfe Class 310: contemporary shunting locomotives ordered a during the same period of modernisation of Renfe's shunter fleet.

Notes

References

Sources

Arenillas Melendo, Justo : "La Traccion en los ferrocarriles españoles, Editorial Via Libre, Madrid, 2007

Renfe Class 311
311
Macosa/Meinfesa/Vossloh Espana locomotives
5 ft 6 in gauge locomotives
Railway locomotives introduced in 1989
Diesel-electric locomotives of Spain